Gwon Ram (Korean: 권람, Hanja: 權擥; 1416 - 6 February 1465), nickname Sohandang (소한당) was a Korean politician, writer, historian, nationalist of the Joseon period. He served as Left State Councillor, and the entourage of Sejo of Joseon. 

He was the father-in-law of general Nam Yi and Shin Su-geun.

Family 
 Great-Great-Great-Grandfather
 Gwon Bu (권부, 權溥) (1262 - 1346)
 Great-Great-Great-Grandmother
 Lady Ryu of the Siryeong Ryu clan (시령 류씨, 始寧 柳氏)
 Great-Great-Grandfather
 Gwon Go (권고, 權皐)
 Great-Grandfather
 Gwon Hui (권희, 權僖) (1319 - 1405)
 Great-Grandmother 
 Lady Han of the Hanyang Han clan (한양 한씨, 漢陽 韓氏) (1315 - 1398)
 Grandfather 
 Gwon Geun (권근, 權近) (1352 - 14 February 1409)
 Grandmother 
 Princess Sukgyeong, Lady Yi of the Gyeongju Yi clan (숙경택주 경주 이씨, 淑敬宅主 慶州 李氏) (? - 1423)
 Father
 Gwon Je (1387 - 1445)
 Uncle - Gwon Gyu (권규, 權跬) (1393 - 1421)
 Aunt - Princess Gyeongan (경안공주) (1393 - 22 April 1415)
 Cousin - Gwon Dam (권담, 權聃) (? - 1439)
 Cousin-in-law - Lady Park of the Hamyang Park clan (함양 박씨, 咸陽朴氏)
 Cousin-in-law - Lady Jeong of the Yeonil Jeong clan (연일 정씨, 延日 鄭氏)
 First cousin - Gwon Yeong-geum (권영금,權英今), Lady Gwon of the Andong Gwon clan
 First cousin-in-law - Kim Hyeon-seok (김현석)
 Cousin - Gwon Chong (권총, 權聰) (1413 - 1480)
 Cousin-in-law - Lady Choi of the Jeonju Choi clan (전주 최씨, 貞夫人 全州 崔氏)
 Cousin - Lady Gwon; died prematurely 
 Aunt - Lady Gwon
 Uncle - Yi Jung-seon (이종선)
 Cousin - Yi Gye-ju (이계주)
 First cousin - Yi Gae (이개) (1417 - 1456)
 Aunt - Lady Gwon
 Uncle - Seo Mi-seong (서미성)
 Cousin - Lady Seo of the Daegu Seo clan (대구 서씨, 大丘 徐氏)
 Cousin-in-law - Choi Hang-e (최항에)
 Cousin - Seo Geo-gwang (서거광)
 Cousin-in-law - Lady Baek of the Suwon Baek clan (수원 백씨)
 Cousin - Seo Geo-jeong (서거정, 徐居正) (1420 - 1488)
 Cousin-in-law - Lady Kim; Kim Yeo-hoe’s daughter (김여회)
 Cousin-in-law - Lady Yi; Yi Yeong-geun’s daughter (이영근)
 First cousin - Seo Bok-gyeong (서복경, 徐福慶)
 Mother
 Lady Yi (이씨, 李氏); Gwon Je’s first wife 
 Unnamed stepmother; Gwon Je’s second wife
 Grandfather - Yi Jun (이준, 李儁)
 Siblings 
 Older brother - Gwon Ji (권지, 權摯)
 Younger brother - Gwon Ban (권반, 權攀)
 Younger brother - Gwon Ma (권마, 權摩)
 Younger brother - Gwon Hyeol (권혈, 權挈)
 Younger brother - Gwon Hyeong (권경, 權擎)
 Younger sister - Lady Gwon of the Andong Gwon clan 
 Brother-in-law - Han Myeong-jin (한명진, 韓明溍) (1426 - 1454)
 Unnamed nephew
 Unnamed niece
 Younger sister - Lady Gwon of the Andong Gwon clan
 Younger half-brother - Gwon Chu (권추, 權揫)
 Wife 
 Princess Consort Yeongwon of the Goseong Yi clan (영원군부인 고성 이씨, 寧原郡夫人 固城 李氏) (1410 - 18 October 1491)
 Children
 Son - Gwon Geol (권걸, 權傑)
 Daughter-in-law - Lady Nam of the Uiryeong Nam clan (의령 남씨, 宜寧 南氏)
 Son - Gwon Geon (권건, 權健)
 Daughter - Lady Gwon of the Andong Gwon clan  
 Son-in-law - Han Seo-gu (한서구, 韓瑞龜)
 Daughter - Lady Gwon of the Andong Gwon clan  
 Son-in-law - Park Sa-hwa (박사화, 朴士華)
 Daughter - Lady Gwon of the Andong Gwon clan  
 Son-in-law - Shin Eok-nyeon (신억년, 申億年)
 Daughter - Lady Gwon of the Andong Gwon clan  
 Son-in-law - Nam Yi (남이, 南怡) (1443 - 11 November 1468)
 Granddaughter - Nam Gu-eul-geum (남구을금, 南求乙金), Lady Nam of the Uiryeong Nam clan (의령 남씨, 宜寧 南氏)
 Daughter - Lady Gwon of the Andong Gwon clan  
 Son-in-law - Kim Su-hyeong (김수형, 金壽亨)
 Daughter - Internal Princess Consort Yeongga of the Andong Gwon clan (영가부부인 안동 권씨, 永嘉府夫人 安東 權氏); Shin Su-geun’s first wife
 Son-in-law - Shin Su-geun (신수근, 愼守勤) (1450 - 1506)
 Step-granddaughter - Queen Dangyeong of the Geochang Shin clan (단경왕후 신씨) (7 February 1487 - 27 December 1557)
 Daughter - Lady Gwon of the Andong Gwon clan  
 Son-in-law - Shin Mal-pyeong (신말평, 申末平)
 Daughter - Lady Gwon of the Andong Gwon clan  
 Son-in-law - Min Sa-geon (민사건, 閔師騫)

Book 
 동국통감
 《Yeokdaebyeongyo》 (역대병요, 歷代兵要)
 《Sohandang jip》(소한당집, 所閑堂集)
 《Eungjesiju》 (응제시주, 應製詩註)

Popular culture
 Portrayed by Lee Dae-yeon in the 2011 KBS2 TV series The Princess' Man.
 Portrayed by Kim Yong-hee in the 2011 JTBC TV series Insu, The Queen Mother.

References

External links 
 Gwon Ram:Nate 
 Gwon Ram  
 Gwon Ram:Naver 

1416 births
1465 deaths
15th-century Korean people
Korean Confucianists
Korean revolutionaries
Historians of Korea